Mede may refer to:

 A member of the Medes, an ancient Iranian people who lived in an area known as Media
 Mede, Lombardy, a comune (municipality) in Italy
 Petra Mede (born 1970), Swedish comedian and television host

See also
 Mead (disambiguation)
 Meade (disambiguation)
 Medes (disambiguation)